Jules Suetens was a Belgian footballer. He played in seven matches for the Belgium national football team from 1908 to 1914.

References

External links
 

Year of birth missing
Year of death missing
Belgian footballers
Belgium international footballers
Place of birth missing
Association footballers not categorized by position